Tony Bui (born September 14, 1973) is a Vietnamese-born American independent film director in the U.S., most famous for his 1999 film Three Seasons, which debuted at the Sundance Film Festival and became the first film to win both an Audience Award and a Grand Jury Prize. The film was based on Bui's own experiences dealing with the changing landscape and people of his ancestral home of Vietnam. The film starred Harvey Keitel.

Biography

Early life
Bui was born in Vietnam and in 1975 came to the U.S. at the age of two years with his family, as a refugee of the U.S.-Vietnamese war, leaving Vietnam approximately one week before the Fall of Saigon. He was raised in Sunnyvale, California, where his father ran a video store which led to his interest in cinema. He studied film at Loyola Marymount University in Los Angeles.

Career
Bui visited Vietnam several times before making his first short film, the highly successful Yellow Lotus, which also debuted at the Sundance Film Festival and went on to play at festivals around the world.

He has also co-wrote and produced Green Dragon, starring Patrick Swayze and Forest Whitaker, for his older brother Timothy Linh Bui, as well as writing several screenplays for production companies.  He is believed to be developing another feature film project.  For a brief time he was associated with Lazarus, a film in development at Warner Brothers.

Personal life
Bui is the brother of Timothy Linh Bui, a film director and producer. The two have worked together on several films. He is also the nephew of the Vietnamese actor Đơn Dương.

Filmography

Awards and nominations
Austin Film Festival
2001: Won, "Best Advance Screening" - Green Dragon

49th Berlin International Film Festival
1999: Nominated, "Golden Berlin Bear Award" - Three Seasons

Golden Satellite Awards

 2000: Won, "Best Foreign Language Film" - Three Seasons

Humanitas Prize

2001: Won, "Best Film" - Green Dragon

Independent Spirit Award 
2000: Nominated, "Best First Feature (Over $500,000)" - Three Seasons

Portland International Film Festival
1999: Won, "Best First Film" - Three Seasons

Stockholm International Film Festival
1999: Nominated, "Best Film" - Three Seasons

Sundance Film Festival
1999: Won, "Audience Award for Best Dramatic Film" - Three Seasons
1999: Won, " Grand Jury Prize for Best Dramatic Film" - Three Seasons

References

External links
 

1973 births
Living people
Vietnamese film directors
Vietnamese emigrants to the United States
Loyola Marymount University alumni
American film directors of Vietnamese descent
People from Sunnyvale, California
Film directors from California